Goshedan is a hamlet and townland in County Londonderry, Northern Ireland. In the 2001 Census it had a population of 90 people. It is situated within the Derry and Strabane district.

Goshedan is situated astride the Ardmore Road close to the River Faughan some 9 kilometres from the City. It originally comprised 2 public authority housing estates. The northern part of the settlement lies within the proposed Area of High Scenic Value along the Faughan valley.

References

External links
NI Neighbourhood Information System

Villages in County Londonderry
Derry and Strabane district